Eho Mia Agkalia (Greek: Έχω Μια Αγκαλιά; English: I have a hug) is the eighth album by Greek singer Natasa Theodoridou. It was released on 21 December 2006 by Sony BMG Greece and received gold certification, selling 20,000 units. The album was written entirely by Giorgos Moukidis.

Track listing

Credits

Personnel 

 Giorgos Moukidis: orchestration, programming

Production 

 Vasilis Bouloubasis: hair styling
 Giannis Doulamis: executive producer
 Thodoris Ikonomou (Sofita studio): mix engineer, sound engineer
 Giannis Ioannidis (D.P.H.): mastering
 Iakovos Kalaitzakis: make up
 Lefteris Neromiliotis (Sofita studio): mix engineer, sound engineer
 Christos Prentoulis: photographer
 Dimitris Rekouniotis: artwork

References

Natasa Theodoridou albums
Greek-language albums
2006 albums
Sony Music Greece albums